Hasanabad (also Romanized as Ḩasanābād; also known as Ḩasanābād-e Ḩowmeh) is a village in Khvor Khvoreh Rural District, in the Central District of Bijar County, Kurdistan Province, Iran. At the 2006 census, its population was 45, in 9 families. The village is populated by Kurds.

References 

Towns and villages in Bijar County
Kurdish settlements in Kurdistan Province